Joseph Warren Hutton Jr. (October 6, 1928 – October 19, 2009) was an American professional basketball player.

A 6'1" guard, Hutton played his college ball at Hamline University, where he was coached by his father, Joe Hutton Sr. Hutton played two seasons in the National Basketball Association as a member of the Minneapolis Lakers. He averaged 2.5 points per game in his career and won a championship in 1952.

He later coached basketball at Minneapolis North High School and Bloomington Lincoln High School.

References

External links

1928 births
2009 deaths
American men's basketball coaches
American men's basketball players
Basketball players from Saint Paul, Minnesota
Hamline Pipers men's basketball players
High school basketball coaches in Minnesota
Minneapolis Lakers draft picks
Minneapolis Lakers players
Shooting guards